Maldonado Rodolfo José Ramírez García (born 31 July 1988) is a Guatemalan badminton player and coach.
Rodolfo Ramirez won the Men's Doubles event at the Pan American Badminton Championships in 2009 with partner Kevin Cordón. They together also won a gold medal at the 2010 CACSO Games.
From 19-21 April 2022 Rodolfo Ramirez was appointed headcoach at the Caribbean Easter badminton camp 2022 in Paramaribo, Suriname.

Achievements

Pan Am Championships
Men's doubles

Central American and Caribbean Games 
Men's singles

Men's doubles

Mixed doubles

BWF International Challenge/Series (16 titles, 15 runner-up) 
Men's singles

Men's doubles

Mixed doubles

  BWF International Challenge tournament
  BWF International Series tournament
  BWF Future Series tournament

References

External links
 
 Toronto 2015

1988 births
Living people
Sportspeople from Guatemala City
Guatemalan male badminton players
Badminton players at the 2007 Pan American Games
Badminton players at the 2011 Pan American Games
Badminton players at the 2015 Pan American Games
Badminton players at the 2019 Pan American Games
Pan American Games competitors for Guatemala
Central American and Caribbean Games gold medalists for Guatemala
Central American and Caribbean Games silver medalists for Guatemala
Central American and Caribbean Games bronze medalists for Guatemala
Competitors at the 2006 Central American and Caribbean Games
Competitors at the 2010 Central American and Caribbean Games
Competitors at the 2014 Central American and Caribbean Games
Competitors at the 2018 Central American and Caribbean Games
Central American and Caribbean Games medalists in badminton
21st-century Guatemalan people